Andreu Jacob Martinez Foglietti (born 1971) known as Andreu Jacob is a Catalan composer. He works in such musical genres as classical and contemporary music, jazz, flamenco and other musical styles.

Biography 
Born in 1971 in Barcelona , Catalonia (Spain) Jacob was brought up in a poor family that lived in the Raval neighborhood. Jacob showed a great interest in music at the age of 9. He began his musical studies at the Conservatorio Superior de Música del Liceo in Barcelona. A year later he made his first musical performance at theConservatorio Superior de Música del Liceo. At the age 14 he started to work with the Catalan guitarist Max Sunyer.

Andreu took the 1st place in the 75th Composer's Festival Círculo de Bellas Artes in Madrid. He studied carpentry in Barcelona and architectural acoustics in France. In 1990 he published his first work.  At the age of 23 he participated in an international jazz festival in Krakow, Poland and also in Zamosc.

In 1995 at age 24, Andreu got his first sponsorship from the international company Paiste, agreement expiring in 2007 after accepting the proposal to work with his new sponsor Zildjian. He has participated in jazz festivals. Jacob made numerous concerts in different cities  -  (New York, Berlín, Porto, Lisboa, London, Barcelona, Madrid etc.)

Jacob has written music in projects for Thomas Dodd, Peter Gric, Gottfried Helnwein,.

In 2012 he moved to Sweden to continue his work. A year later Andreu Jacob moved to Norway where he lives up to now.

Other activities 

 Make the circuit as an artist in Circuit REASONS JAZZ 2005 Generalitat de Catalunya – Departamento de Cultura.
 Composer of the 57-th at International Astronautical Congress in 2006 under the work "Expanding the Space 
 Participated in the concert with 104 drums,  "Récord Guinness" "Fer volar coloms" by Santi Arisa.
 Music Seminar at RIFF "International Film Festival" Reykjavík (Iceland) 2021

Awards / nominations 
 Best Original Score and Best Drama at "Rome International Movie Awards" 2021 (Italy)
 Best Composer, at Venice Shorts " California " (U.S.) 2021
 Nomination for best album of the year by the disc OUTSIDE
 Nomination for best album by the fusion drive
 Nominated for best sound technician for the disk BLOW
 Nominated for best sound technician for the EYES OF GOD | OJOS DE DIOS
 Nomination for different occasions and categories in the awards

Soundtracks

 SAND © 2021 (Norway) - Norsk filminstitutt  
 Era apenas uma cidade © 2021 (Bazil)
 Cold truth © 2021 (Sweden)
 The Beast Beneath Lake Bullaron © 2021 (Sweden)
 Andetaget © 2021 (Sweden)
 The Shadow (TV serie) © 2021 (Norway)
 Döden i Bullarsjön © 2020 (Sweden)  
 Syrialism © 2020 (Norway) - Norwegian Film Institute
 Antikk © 2020 (Norway)
 Lagos To Oslo © 2020 (Norway) 
 EXUVIA © 2020 Vancouver (Canada)
 The Castle Of Baron Finch © 2020 (U.S.A)
 THE GREAT HUMAN CRIME © 2019 (Sweden)
 Wasteland © 2019 (Sweden)
 LOVE © 2018 (Norway) 
 Lili ser Dig © 2018 (Sweden)
 Frozen Hell © 2018 (Sweden)
 настоящий-сценарий / The Real Screenplay © 2018 (Russia)
 Knuss Meg (Trailer) © 2018 (Norway)
 Brinn Som Solen © 2018 (Sweden)
 Innocent MARA © 2018 (Sweden)
 The Omega point, strikes © 2018 (Norway)
 SANCTUARY © 2017 (Sweden / Norway)
 Humans © 2017 (Sweden)

Sound Designer

 Kunsten å Plystre  © 2021 Norway (Sound Designer) Norwegian Film Institute
 Seyran Ates: Sex, Revolution and Islam © 2021 Norway (Sound Designer) Norwegian Film Institute
 Clear the Saloon © 2018 Norway

Music Performer

 Beforeigners HBO © 2019 / 2021 (Norway)
- Episode #2.6 (2021)
- Episode #2.5 (2021)
- Episode #1.4 (2019)
- Episode #2.4 (2019)
- Episode #2.3 (2019)
- Episode #2.2 (2019)
- Episode #2.1 (2019)

Collaborations in Soundtracks

 Laura esta sola "LAUREN FILMS" (2003) 
 La memoria de los peces "MANGA FILMS" (2004) 
 Glamour sex "COCO FILMS" (2003) 
 Private Château "PRIVATE FILMS" (2005) 
 El mar no es azul de "MANGA FILMS" (2005)
 Arcus de Biart de "MANGA FILMS" (2004)
 La entrega de Bert Palmen (2004)

Own records 

 El Valle de Cabuérniga (1990)
 The perfume of honey (1997)
 6666 (1998)
 Dragon Dreams Vol. I (2000) 
 Dragon Dreams Vol. II (2000)
 Digital Loneliness (2001)
 A.Jacob v.1.0 – Black (2002)
 A.Jacob v.1.0 –White (2002)
 The pious sinner (2003)
 Uelhuxe (2003)
 Blind passenger to Kamtschka (2004)
 Home das Bubas Vol. I (2005) 
 Home das Bubas Vol. II (2005)
 Die enttaeuschung des Hans Castorp (2006)
 Natural Order (2007)
 Outside (2008)
 BLOW (2009)
 Ojos de Dios (2010) 
 Mlechny put (2011) 
 Manuscritos para Anastasía (2012)
 Amargo despertar (2012)
 Ett nytt land utanför mitt fönster (2013)
 I miss you (2013)
 My sweet love (2013)
 Guds Øyne (2014)
 Manuskripter til Anastasia (2014)
 KUNST art symbiosis (2015)
 Ja vi elsker dette landet (2015)
 Rjukan, Den evige omfavnelse av fjellet (2015)

Collective works 

 Acid by Vanguard School (1995)
 Resonance by Vanguard School (1995) 
 Boing Boing (2002) 
 Batería Total (1998) 
 Jazz i Noves Músiques de Catalunya 7 (2001)
 Jazz i Noves Músiques de Catalunya 9 (2003)
 Jazz i Noves Músiques de Catalunya 10 (2004)
 JAÇZ Nº1 (2004) 
 Revista de Jazz 04 (2005) 
 Projet ONE / Maxi Tuning (2003)
 Razzmatazz 03 (2006) 
 Ukiyohe Behaviour (2003)
 A los viejos Maestros / El niño de la Chata (2010)
 Hope / Crystina Maez (2010)
 Todo en beso / Malena placeres (2008)
 Eva / gremio afiliado de joyeros (2006)
 Respiraire / Maite Barrera (2011)

Symphonies

 Sinfonia nr. 24, Solens synfoni (2014) 
 Gumnerside – Kammerkonserte nº 2 (2014)
 Sinfonia nr. 23, Rjukan Den evige omfavnelse av fjellet (2013) 
 Expanding the Space – 57th International Austronautical Congress, (2006)
 Concierto para piano y orquesta nº 1, op. 36, en Si bemol mayor
 Concierto para piano y orquesta nº 2, op. 225, en Do mayor
 Concierto para piano y orquesta nº 3, op. 280
 Missa solemnis, opus 38
 Symphonic Nr. 8 C- moll op. 65 / Dimitri Schostakowisich
 Unter Grünen
 Die Hundekatastrophe
 El Valle de los Alientos op. 42

References

External links 
 Official site Andreu Jacob
 Andreu Jacob on IMDB

Musicians from Barcelona
Norwegian composers
Norwegian male composers
Composers from Catalonia
1971 births
Living people
Spanish male musicians